Type 45 may refer to:
 Type 45 destroyer of the British Royal Navy
 Type 45 240 mm howitzer, a weapon of the Imperial Japanese Army
 Type 45 Siamese Mauser, misnomer for Type 46 Siamese Mauser, a service rifle adopted by the government of Siam